Kal Jahan (also Romanized as Kal Jahān) is a village in Saroleh Rural District, Meydavud District, Bagh-e Malek County, Khuzestan Province, Iran. At the 2006 census, its population was 73, in 14 families.

References 

Populated places in Bagh-e Malek County